Juliet Nalukenge (born 14 August 2003) is a Ugandan footballer who plays for Cypriot club Apollon Ladies and the Uganda women's national team (The Crested Cranes). A promising forward, Nalukenge was named Ugandan Women's Player of the Year in 2019 and in March 2021 finished ninth in the Goal (website) NXGN Award for the best young female footballer in the world.

Club career 
Although Nalukenge is a Christian, her football skills won her a scholarship to Kawempe Muslim High School. She began playing for the attached women's football team at youth level in the regional leagues, and in 2015–16 broke into the first team who play at FUFA Women Elite League level.

International career 
Nalukenge won her first cap for the senior Uganda women's national team on 8 April 2018, in a 2018 Africa Women Cup of Nations qualification first round fixture against Kenya.

International goals
Scores and results list Uganda goal tally first

References 

2003 births
Living people
People from Mityana District
Ugandan women's footballers
Women's association football forwards
Uganda women's international footballers
Ugandan expatriate women's footballers
Ugandan expatriates in Cyprus
Expatriate women's footballers in Cyprus
21st-century Ugandan women